Andrew John Lees (born 1947) is Professor of Neurology at the National Hospital for Neurology and Neurosurgery, Queen Square, London and University College London. In 2011 he was named as the world's most highly cited Parkinson's disease researcher.

Career
Lees studied medicine at the Royal London Hospital in Whitechapel where he was awarded the Jonathan Hutchinson Prize for Clinical Medicine, and then trained as a neurologist at the Pitié-Salpêtrière Hospital, Paris, University College Hospital and at the National Hospital for Neurology and Neurosurgery where he was appointed consultant neurologist at the age of 33.

Lees was director of the Reta Lila Weston Institute of Neurological Studies at University College London from 1998 to 2012, an institution dedicated to research into neurodegenerative diseases. In 1987 he co-founded the Queen Square Brain Bank for Neurological Disorders (QSBB), which now houses the largest collection of Parkinson's brains in the world and is where he conducted the research that led to the Queen Square Brain Bank criteria for Parkinson's disease. From 2002 to 2012 he served as director of the Sara Koe PSP Research Centre funded by the PSP Association to conduct research into progressive supranuclear palsy.

He was responsible for the introduction of apomorphine to treat advanced complications of Parkinson's disease including L-dopa induced refractory off periods and dyskinesias.

Awards and achievements
Lees received the American Academy of Neurology Movement Disorders Life Time Achievement Award for his outstanding achievements in the field of Parkinson's disease and other movement disorders (2006). He delivered the Drucker Memorial Lecture, Beth Israel, Deaconess Medical Center, Boston, the Gowers Memorial Lecture at the National Hospital for Neurology and Neurosurgery, Queen Square in 2007 and the Lord Brain Memorial Lecture at the Royal London Hospital (2010), the Melvin Yahr Memorial Lecture Mount Sinai Hospital New York (2010). In 2012, he was awarded the Dingebauer Prize by the German Society of Neurology for his outstanding achievement in the field of Movement Disorders. In 2014 he was the recipient of the Jay Van Andel Award for outstanding research in Parkinson's disease. In 2015 Lees was awarded the Association of British Neurologists Medal, and the British Neuropsychiatry Association Medal in 2020. He received the Bing Spear Award for outstanding contributions towards Saner drug policies in 2016, and has been awarded the Parkinson Canada's Donald Calne Award and Lectureship for 2017, and Journal of Parkinson's Disease, 'Parkinson Prize 2020 co-winner' with Professor Tom Foltynie for the paper, "Motor and Cognitive Advantages Persist 12 Months After Exenatide Exposure in Parkinson's Disease".

He delivered the 2021 Fitzpatrick Lecture at the Royal College of Physicians with the title, 'Soulful Neurology'. He was also the recipient of the Institute of Neurology, UCL Prize Lecture Award 2021, and appointed the Chester L Stephens Sr. Lecturer at the University of South Florida, Morsani College of Medicne 2021.

Other achievements include: Council Member for the Academy of Medical Sciences, United Kingdom, National Institute for Health and Care Research (NIHR) Senior investigator, Co-founder and past President of The Movement Disorder Society, Founding Editor of Behavioural Neurology (1988- 1993), Former Co-Editor-in-Chief of the journal Movement Disorders, UK Government National Institute for Health and Care Excellence Guidleline Development Group for Parkinson's Disease (2016-2019), Visiting Professor to the Hospital Sao Rafaele, Salvador Brazil, Honorary overseas member of the Academia Nacional de Medicina, Brazil.

Publications

Scientific articles
Lees is recognised as a highly cited neuroscientist on the Institute for Scientific Information "ISI Highly Cited Researchers" database with an h-index of 130 and is the world's most highly cited Parkinson's disease researcher with over 23,000 citations since 1985 and co-author of 8 citation classics.

Media
In addition to his academic career Lees has written a book about the city of Liverpool and the authorized biography of footballer Ray Kennedy. Lees also served as medical advisor to Patient 39 the film adaptation of a William Boyd short story and has written about how both Conan Doyle and William Burroughs have influenced his career as a neurologist.

Lees was a longstanding friend of Oliver Sacks, who also trained at National Hospital for Neurology and Neurosurgery, Queen Square, London and was acknowledged in the preface of Sacks books Awakenings, a story about L-dopa treatment of encephalitis lethargica which was made into a film starring Robert De Niro and Robin Williams, and The Island of the Colorblind, which deals with parkinsonism caused by Lytico-bodig disease.

In his memoir 'Mentored by a Madman' and 'Brainspotting' Lees explains his career was influenced by Arthur Conan Doyle's character Sherlock Holmes and by the self-experimentation of William S. Burroughs, author of Naked Lunch.

Books
 

 
   A biography of Ray Kennedy, the former England football player who developed Parkinson's disease at the age of 35. Michael Joseph and Penguin Books London

 

 

  

  
 Brazil That Never Was. Notting Hill Editions and New York Review of Books. 2020. 
 Brainspotting: Adventures in Neurology. Notting Hill Editions. 2022. ISBN 9781912559367

References

External links

 Andrew J Lees Profile at University College of London
 RL Weston Institute

English surgeons
Living people
1947 births
People educated at Roundhay School
Alumni of University College London
Academics of University College London
NIHR Senior Investigators